Dick Monteith may refer to:
 Dick Monteith (politician) (born 1932), American politician from California
 Dick Monteith (footballer) (1887–1959), Australian rules footballer